Scipione Dura (died 1551) was a Roman Catholic prelate who served as Bishop of Lacedonia (1538–1551).

Biography
On 23 September 1538, Scipione Dura was appointed during the papacy of Pope Paul II as Bishop of Lacedonia.
He served as Bishop of Lacedonia until his death in 1551.

References

External links and additional sources
 (for Chronology of Bishops) 
 (for Chronology of Bishops) 

16th-century Italian Roman Catholic bishops
Bishops appointed by Pope Paul II
1551 deaths